A.B.M. Nurul Islam was a Member of the 4th National Assembly of Pakistan as a representative of East Pakistan.

Career
Islam was a Member of the  4th National Assembly of Pakistan representing Faridpur-cum-Dacca.

References

Pakistani MNAs 1965–1969
Living people
Year of birth missing (living people)